John George Meyers (February 14, 1865 – November 12, 1943) was an American Major League Baseball third baseman.

External links

1865 births
1943 deaths
19th-century baseball players
Major League Baseball third basemen
Philadelphia Athletics (AA) players
Baseball players from Philadelphia